Ralph I of Vermandois (French: Raoul Ier) (d. 14 October 1152) was Count of Vermandois. He was a son of Hugh, Count of Vermandois and his wife, Adelaide, Countess of Vermandois. Ralph was a grandson of Henry I of France, while Ralph‘s mother had been the Carolingian heiress to Herbert IV, Count of Vermandois.

Ralph’s paternal uncle was Philip I of France. Through him Ralph was a first cousin of Louis VI of France and a first cousin once removed of Louis VII of France.

Ralph served as the seneschal of France during the reign of Louis VII. Under pressure from the queen, Eleanor of Aquitaine, Louis allowed Ralph to repudiate his wife, Eleanor of Champagne, sister of Stephen, King of England, in favor of Eleanor of Aquitaine's sister, Petronilla of Aquitaine. This led to a war with Theobald II of Champagne, who was the brother of Ralph's first wife Eleanor. The war lasted two years (1142–44) and ended with the occupation of Champagne by the royal army.

Ralph and Petronilla were excommunicated by Pope Innocent II for a marriage deemed illegitimate, overriding three bishops who had already annulled Ralph's prior marriage. With Eleanor's death in 1147, the following year Pope Eugene III, legitimized the marriage at the Council of Reims.

Family and children
Ralph was married three times:

1. in 1125 to Eleanor, daughter of Stephen, Count of Blois. Their marriage ended in divorce in 1140 and she died in 1147.

2. in 1140 to Petronilla of Aquitaine; they had three children:
Elizabeth (or Isabelle) Mabile, countess of Vermandois and Valois (1143–1183), married Philip I, Count of Flanders; no issue.
Ralph II, count of Vermandois and Valois (1145–1167), was the first husband of Margaret of Lorraine, later countess of Flanders. He died of leprosy in 1167 without issue.
Eleanor, countess of Vermandois and Valois (b. 1148? – d. 1213/1214). She married four times as follows, but had no issue:
1. Godfrey of Hainaut, Count of Ostervant (d. 1163).
2. before 1167 William IV, Count of Nevers.
3. ca 1170 Matthew of Alsace.
4. ca 1175 Count Matthew III of Beaumont-sur-Oise.

3. in 1152 with Laurette of Flanders, daughter of Thierry, Count of Flanders and Swanhilde. They had no children.

References

Sources

Capetian House of Vermandois
1152 deaths
Counts of Vermandois
People temporarily excommunicated by the Catholic Church
French Roman Catholics